161P/Hartley–IRAS is a periodic comet with an orbital period of 21 years. It fits the classical definition of a Halley-type comet with (20 years < period < 200 years).

This was one of six comets discovered by the infrared space telescope IRAS, in 1983.

References

External links 
 Orbital simulation from JPL (Java) / Horizons Ephemeris
 161P/Hartley-IRAS – Seiichi Yoshida @ aerith.net
161P at Kronk's Cometography

Periodic comets
Halley-type comets
161P
0161
Discoveries by Malcolm Hartley
Discoveries by IRAS
IRAS catalogue objects
19831104